The Visionaries (Italian: I visionari) is a 1968 Italian film directed by Maurizio Ponzi. It won the Golden Leopard at the Locarno International Film Festival and is inspired by the writings by Robert Musil.

Cast
 Pierluigi Aprà		
 Adriana Asti		
 Lidia Biondi		
 Jean-Marc Bory		
 Olimpia Carlisi		
 Laura De Marchi		
 Sergio De Vecchi		
 Luigi Diberti		
 Fabienne Fabre

Reception

Awards
1968 Locarno International Film Festival
Won: Golden Leopard

References

External links

1968 drama films
1968 films
Italian black-and-white films
Films directed by Maurizio Ponzi
Golden Leopard winners
Italian drama films
1960s Italian-language films
1960s Italian films